Conant's garter snake (Thamnophis conanti) is a species of snake in the family Colubridae. The species is endemic to Mexico.

Etymology
The specific name conanti is in honor of the American herpetologist Roger Conant.

Geographic range
T. conanti is found in the Mexican states of Puebla and Veracruz.

Habitat
The preferred habitat of T. conanti is oak woodland at elevations above .

Reproduction
T. conanti is viviparous.

References

Further reading
Heimes, Peter (2016). Snakes of Mexico: Herpetofauna Mexicana Vol. I. Frankfurt, Germany: Chimaira. 572 pp. .
Rossman, Douglas A.; Burbrink, Frank T. (2005). "Species limits within the Mexican garter snakes of the Thamnophis godmani complex". Occasional Papers of the Museum of Natural Science, Louisiana State University (79): 1-43. (Thamnophis conanti, new species, pp. 29–31, Figure 12).
Woolrich-Piña GA, García-Padilla E, DeSantis DL, Johnson JD, Mata-Silva V, Wilson LD (2017). "The herpetofauna of Puebla, Mexico: composition, distribution, and conservation status". Mesoamerican Herpetology 4 (4): 791–884.

External links

Reptiles described in 2005
Reptiles of Mexico
Thamnophis
Taxa named by Douglas A. Rossman